The Novato Unified School District is a school district in Novato, California.

Schools

Preschools
Ready, Set, Grow! (Early Education) (located at Rancho Elementary)
YMCA Early Learning (Preschool) (located at San Rafael YMCA)

Elementary schools
Hamilton School (K–8)
Loma Verde Elementary School
Lu Sutton Elementary School
Lynwood Elementary School
Olive Elementary School
Pleasant Valley Elementary School
Rancho Elementary School
San Ramon Elementary School

Middle schools
Sinaloa Middle School
San Jose Intermediate School
Hamilton School (K–8)

High schools
San Marin High School 
Novato High School, including the Marin School of the Arts

Alternative education
Marin Oaks High School
Hill Education Center
NOVA Independent Study
Novato Charter School
VLA (virtual learning academy)

Former schools
Hill Middle School closed in 2011, with the campus becoming the Hill Education Center

References

External links

School districts in Marin County, California
Novato, California